Dan or Daniel Noble may refer to:

 Daniel Noble (Medal of Honor) (1838–1903), American Civil War sailor
Daniel Noble (New York judge) (1859–1937), American lawyer and judge
 Daniel Noble (physician) (1810–1885), English physician
 Daniel E. Noble (1901–1980), American engineer
 Dan Noble (1846–?), English-American thief and confidence man
 Dan Noble (footballer) (born 1970), English footballer
 Danny Noble (born 1989), American football player